KYKV (103.1 FM) is a radio station broadcasting a Contemporary Christian format. Licensed to Selah, Washington, United States, the station serves Yakima and Kittitas Counties from a transmitter northeast of Terrace Heights. The station is currently owned by Educational Media Foundation. Prior to the K-LOVE format, it aired Top 40 music.

References

External links

Contemporary Christian radio stations in the United States
K-Love radio stations
YKV
Radio stations established in 1984
1984 establishments in Washington (state)
Educational Media Foundation radio stations
YKV